John Michael Henry (September 2, 1863 – June 11, 1939) was an outfielder and starting pitcher in Major League Baseball who played between  and  for the Cleveland Blues (1884), Baltimore Orioles (1885), Washington Nationals (1886) and New York Giants (1890). Henry was born in Springfield, Massachusetts. He threw left-handed. Batting side is unknown.

In a four-season career, Henry was a .243 hitter (53-for-218) with 28 runs and RBI in 60 games, including nine doubles and 11 stolen bases. He did not hit home runs. As a pitcher, he posted a 4–14 record with a 4.09 ERA in 18 starts, including one shutout and 18 complete games, giving up 64 earned runs on 152 hits and 54 walks while striking out 73 in 140 ⅔  innings of work.

Death 
Henry died in Hartford, Connecticut, at the age of 75.

See also
1884 Cleveland Blues season
1885 Baltimore Orioles season
1886 Washington Nationals season
1890 New York Giants season

External links
Baseball Reference
Retrosheet

Baltimore Orioles (AA) players
Cleveland Blues (NL) players
New York Giants (NL) players
Washington Nationals (1886–1889) players
19th-century baseball players
Major League Baseball outfielders
Major League Baseball pitchers
Baseball players from Massachusetts
1863 births
1939 deaths
Wilmington Quicksteps (minor league) players
Grand Rapids (minor league baseball) players
Norfolk (minor league baseball) players
Hartford Dark Blues (minor league) players
Scranton Indians players
Newark Little Giants players
Salem Witches players
Hartford (minor league baseball) players
Wilmington Blue Hens players
New Haven Nutmegs players
Troy Trojans (minor league) players
Hartford Bluebirds players